Sniatyn (older) is a town located in Kolomyia Raion of Ivano-Frankivsk Oblast, in western Ukraine along the Prut river. Sniatyn hosts the administration of Sniatyn urban hromada, one of the hromadas of Ukraine. Population: . In 2001, population was around 10,500.

In the interbellum period, it was a rail border crossing between Poland and Romania.

History

The first mention of the town is in 1158. Ksniatyn was named after Kostiantyn Stroslavich, a boyar and general of Yaroslav Osmomysl. The town was given the Magdeburg Rights in 1448. As a result of the first of Partitions of Poland (Treaty of St-Petersburg dated 5 July 1772, Sniatyn (and Galicia) was attributed to the Habsburg Monarchy.

For more details, see the article Kingdom of Galicia and Lodomeria.

In 1939 Sniatyn was the temporary seat of American embassy in Poland, as the diplomatic personnel abandoned Warsaw after the first German Nazi bombings.

Nearly all of Sniatyn's Jewish population was murdered during the Holocaust.  Many were shot and buried in the local forest.  Some died from disease and starvation in the ghetto.  Approximately 1,500 people were sent to Belzec.

Until 18 July 2020, Sniatyn was the administrative center of Sniatyn Raion. The raion was abolished in July 2020 as part of the administrative reform of Ukraine, which reduced the number of raions of Ivano-Frankivsk Oblast to six. The area of Sniatyn Raion was merged into Kolomyia Raion.

Gallery

References

External links
 SNYATYN, (SNIATYN): A Jewish shtetl from the mid 16th century through the mid 1940s
 A polish-ukrainian project on the history of Sniatyn

Cities in Ivano-Frankivsk Oblast
Kingdom of Galicia and Lodomeria
Stanisławów Voivodeship
Shtetls
Populated places on the Prut
Magdeburg rights
Cities of district significance in Ukraine
Holocaust locations in Ukraine